Enda Markey (born 3 June 1976) is an Irish-born, Sydney-based, theatrical producer and former singer and actor. He is the producer of the stage productions Side by Side by Sondheim and the international tour of Boublil and Schonberg's Do You Hear The People Sing?, and the Australian revival of Willy Russell's Blood Brothers.

Performer
Markey was born in Dublin. At sixteen, he was awarded a scholarship to train at London's Laine Theatre Arts' Musical Theatre Course. Following his training, he played Rick in the London production of A Slice of Saturday Night. He appeared in the Irish premiere of Follies with Lorna Luft, Dave Willetts and Millicent Martin. Follies was followed by an appearance in Side By Side By Sondheim, giving Markey his first starring role.   Side By Side was immediately followed by his return to A Slice of Saturday Night in Dublin, recreating the role of Rick.

Theatrical appearances in Australia include The Mangina Monologues in Melbourne and Sydney and the world premiere of Flying Solo with Paula Duncan, Noeline Brown, Jacinta John and Barry Quin, directed by Judy Nunn.

As a concert and cabaret performer, Enda appeared in leading venues around the world and made numerous appearances on television.

Producer

Side By Side By Sondheim
In April 2011, Markey produced and starred in a new Australian production of Side By Side By Sondheim, appearing alongside Margi de Ferranti, Amelia Cormack and Jessica Rowe This production toured until November 2012, eventually replacing Cormack with Rachael Beck and then Lucy Maunder; De Ferranti with Geraldine Turner; and Michael Falzon taking over the male role from Markey (who remained as producer).

On 20 April 2012, Markey produced a Gala Concert version of Side By Side by Sondheim featuring Ruthie Henshall at the Theatre Royal. The gala was held to support White Ribbon Australia, a charity which seeks to raise awareness of violence against women. 
 The  gala was part of an ongoing tour, which had started in April 2011 at Sydney's Seymour Centre.

The cast, described as "some of the brightest stars in musical theatre" included

 Ruthie Henshall
 Rachael Beck
 Mitchell Butel
 Alinta Chidzey
 Peter Cousens
 Paula Duncan
 Margi de Ferranti
 Lucy Durack
 Michael Falzon
 Virginia Gay
 Erin James
 Melissa Langton
 Ben Lewis
 Stephen Mahy
 Enda Markey
 Elise McCann
 Meow Meow
 Amanda Muggleton
 Lara Mulcahy
 Judy Nunn
 Anna O'Byrne
 Andrew O'Keefe
 Anita Plateris
 Shaun Rennie
 Jessica Rowe
 Garry Scale
 Lyn Shakespeare
 Geraldine Turner
 Bruce Venables
 Belinda Wollaston

Do You Hear The People Sing?
Enda Markey Presents Do You Hear The People Sing?  premiered at Shanghai Grand Theatre 27 November until 1 December 2013. Markey, together with Alain Boublil and Claude-Michel Schönberg presented a fundraising performance of the show at Resorts World Manila starring Lea Salonga, David Harris and Marie Zamora with Filipino performers making guest appearances. Do You Hear The People Sing? continued its tour at Taipei International Convention Centre starring Michael Ball, David Harris, Amanda Harrison, Ana Marina and Jennifer Paz. In 2022, an Australian production will tour to Sydney Opera House and Arts Centre Melbourne.

The cast for the tour are
 Michael Ball
 John Owen-Jones
 Rachel Tucker
 Bobby Fox
 David Harris
 Sooha Kim
 Suzie Mathers
 Marie Zamora

Previous versions of the show have included:
 Michael Ball 
 Lea Salonga or Jennifer Paz 
 Amanda Harrison 
 David Harris
 Marie Zamora or Ana Marina
 
Do You Hear The People Sing? features the work of Alain Boublil and Claude-Michel Schönberg including music from Les Misérables, Miss Saigon, Martin Guerre, The Pirate Queen and La Revolution Francaise.  It is conducted by Guy Simpson and directed by Andrew Pole.

Blood Brothers
In February 2015, Enda Markey presented Blood Brothers at the Hayes Theatre in Sydney, starring Helen Dallimore, Bobby Fox, Blake Bowden and Michael Cormick.  Helen Dallimore was nominated for a Helpmann Awards and won a Glug Award for her performance.  The production played a limited season in Melbourne.

Defying Gravity: the songs of Stephen Schwartz
In February 2016, Enda Markey presented Broadway Stars Sutton Foster, Aaron Tveit and Betty Buckley together with Joanna Ampil, Helen Dallimore and David Harris in a concert celebrating the work of Broadway composer Stephen Schwartz at Theatre Royal.

Bobby Fox: The Irish Boy
In June 2019, Enda Markey presented the world premiere of Bobby Fox: The Irish Boy at Sydney Opera House before a short tour which included the Adelaide Cabaret Festival.

Ruthie Henshall - Live & Intimate
In June 2019, Ruthie Henshall commenced her first tour of Australia in "Live & Intimate" which included performances at Sydney Opera House, Queensland Performing Arts Centre and the Adelaide Cabaret Festival.  The concerts were met with unanimous praise from critics.

Anna O'Byrne - Becoming Eliza
In June 2022, Anna O'Byrne - Becoming Eliza received its world premiere at Sydney Opera House. In Becoming Eliza, Anna O’Byrne reflects on her experience creating the role of Eliza Doolittle in the Australian production of My Fair Lady, which was directed by Julie Andrews in 2016. O'Byrne shared stories about working intimately with Andrews, as well as the lessons she learned from both Dame Julie and Eliza. The performance was critically praised and will tour into 2023.

References

External links
 Enda Markey

1976 births
Living people
Irish male television actors
Irish male stage actors
Irish male musical theatre actors
Theatre people from Dublin (city)